William Stokes (28 July 1886 – 4 October 1954) was an Australian cricketer. He played eight first-class matches for Western Australia between 1921/22 and 1928/29.

See also
 List of Western Australia first-class cricketers

References

External links
 

1886 births
1954 deaths
Australian cricketers
Western Australia cricketers